"Matador de Passarinho" (Portuguese for "Bird Killer") is a song written, composed and performed by the Brazilian musician Rogério Skylab, and originally included on his second studio album, Skylab, from 1999. In an interview Skylab explained that the song is a "perversion" of "Passaredo", a composition by Francis Hime and Chico Buarque.

The song became famous after one of Skylab's appearances at the Programa do Jô, becoming one of the musician's greatest hits. Besides, the song is considered the greatest hit of the history of the Rio de Janeiro underground scene.

The song eventually gave its name to a talk show hosted by Skylab from 2012 to 2014 at Canal Brasil, in which he interviewed celebrities forgotten by the mainstream media.

In 2016 Skylab and Lívio Tragtenberg wrote a sequel to the song, "Matador de Passarinho 2". It was included on the duo's second collaborative album, Skylab & Tragtenberg, Vol. 2.

References in popular culture
The song is mentioned on page 157 of Wallace Fauth's book amortebeijoparasempre (Editora Baraúna, 2008). In the excerpt, the author says: "I turned up the music's volume to the max and began to listen to Rogério Skylab's 'Matador de Passarinho'".

References

1999 songs
Obscenity controversies in music